His Wedding Night is a 1917 American two-reel silent comedy film written, directed by, and starring Roscoe "Fatty" Arbuckle.

Plot

Arbuckle plays a drug store clerk, soda jerk, and gas station attendant, who can be both lazy and dishonest. After he mixes a soda for one customer with elaborate gestures and juggling of utensils, he attends the perfume counter, where another customer has been indulging herself with a free sample. After he confronts her, he is distracted while an African American customer steps up to the counter. When the clerk hugs her and then realizes it is a different customer, he almost faints. Later on, while still on the job, he proposes to his boss's daughter Alice (Alice Mann), and she gleefully accepts. The scene then switches to the gas pump, where Arbuckle's character switches the sign to a higher price when a person with an expensive car drives up. After the car drives away, he drinks from the pump. Meanwhile inside, Al (Al St. John), another admirer of Alice, also proposes to her while they are eating watermelon. When she is tells him she is already engaged to the clerk, Al becomes outraged and begins causing a commotion in the store. After a food fight that involves several customers, the owner of the store throws Al out. Later in the day a delivery boy (Buster Keaton), after a prat fall over a bicycle rack, delivers Alice's wedding dress to her room above the store. He agrees to model it for her so she can see how it looks. When a male customer enters and annoys the clerk, he puts chloroform in the sample bottle to knock him out if he comes in again. The male customer never returns, but several female customers end up knocking themselves out. When a pretty woman arrives, Fatty deliberately knocks her unconscious so he can kiss her. He knocks out his boss, who could be a witness, as well. After he sees another customer sampling the perfume, he is shocked when it has no effect on her, even when she drinks it. He investigates by spraying himself with the "perfume" but is himself knocked out. With Arbuckle's character unconscious, Al, the rejected lover, sneaks into the store with his gang and kidnaps the delivery boy, thinking it is Alice, since his face is covered by a wedding veil. They tie him up and put a sack over his head and, escaping out of the second story window, take the delivery boy by to the justice of the peace's office. There they attempt to force the justice of peace to marry them at gunpoint. However, the clerk regains consciousness and, thinking the group has actually kidnapped Alice, pursues the group, but only after he comically struggles with a mule that he wants to hook to a wagon. He thwarts the gang just in time. He then convinces the justice of the peace to marry him to the delivery boy, who, since his head is still covered in the sack, he thinks is Alice. Alice, discovering what has happened, gets on a bicycle and heads to the justice of the peace's office as well. She arrives in time to stop the clerk from marrying the delivery boy. The clerk then throws the delivery boy into the room with Al and his henchmen. While that scene of slapstick fighting goes on in that room, the clerk and Alice must have been married, for in the final scene the clerk pays the justice of the peace but then sprays him with the chloroform in the perfume bottle and takes his money back. The film ends long before the newly wed couple reach their wedding night, as the title might have suggested would be forthcoming.

Cast

 Roscoe "Fatty" Arbuckle as Drugstore soda clerk
 Al St. John as Rival Suitor
 Buster Keaton as Delivery Boy
 Alice Mann as Alice
 Arthur Earle
 Jimmy Bryant
 Josephine Stevens as Lady Customer
 Alice Lake
 Natalie Talmadge as Pretty lady in the car (uncredited)

See also
 Roscoe Arbuckle filmography
 Buster Keaton filmography

References

External links

, however, the last minute of the film is missing.
 His Wedding Night on YouTube
 His Wedding Night at the International Buster Keaton Society

1917 comedy films
1917 films
1917 short films
1910s American films
American black-and-white films
American silent short films
Cross-dressing in American films
Films directed by Roscoe Arbuckle
Films with screenplays by Roscoe Arbuckle
Paramount Pictures films
Silent American comedy films